P128 may refer to:

 Papyrus 128, a biblical manuscript
 , a patrol boat of the Turkish Navy
 P128, a state regional road in Latvia